Persebaya Putri (English: Persebaya Women's), is an Indonesia professional Women's football club based in Surabaya, East Java, Indonesia. It currently plays in the Liga 1 Putri, the top women's league in Indonesia.

History
In July 2019, Persebaya announced their commitment to take part in the inaugural season of Liga 1 Putri, a women's football competition in Indonesia and formed a women's football team.

On Friday, 27 September 2019, Persebaya decided to resign after sending a letter to PSSI to postpone participation in the 2019 Liga 1 Putri. The plan was that the Women in Green would enter the competition next year. But Persebaya finally decided to take part in the 2019 Liga 1 Putri. The obligation of every Liga 1 team to take part in the women's competition next season was taken into consideration.

Players

Current squad

References

External links
 

Persebaya Surabaya
 Association football clubs established in 2019
Women's football clubs in Indonesia